The Pakistan national cricket team toured Australia in the 1989–90 season, under the captaincy of Imran Khan. The series set a Pakistan team, regarded as one of the strongest in the world against an Australian team returning from an unexpectedly successful tour of England. The series was marred by a series of incidents and conflicts, including a walk off by the Pakistani players during a tour match against Victoria in protest at an umpire's ruling. The three Test series was won by Australia 1–0.

The touring party consisted of Imran Khan (captain), Aamer Malik, Aaqib Javed, Abdul Qadir, Ijaz Ahmed, Javed Miandad, Mansoor Akhtar, Maqsood Rana, Mushtaq Ahmed, Nadeem Ghauri, Rameez Raja, Saeed Anwar, Saleem Malik, Saleem Yousuf, Shoaib Mohammad, Tauseef Ahmed, Waqar Younis and Wasim Akram.

Summary of results

Pakistan played 17 games during their tour, losing nine and winning five with three draws. Six of these were first class cricket matches and Pakistan went without a win - including the three Test matches which saw one defeat to Australia and two draws.

1st Test

2nd Test

3rd Test

Other matches
Pakistan also competed in a tri-nation ODI tournament involving Australia and Sri Lanka they won 5 of their 8 round robin matches. In the best of three final with Australia, they lost 2–0.

References

External sources
 Australia v Pakistan, 1989-1990
 CricketArchive

Further reading
 Chris Harte, A History of Australian Cricket, André Deutsch, 1993
 Playfair Cricket Annual 1990
 Wisden Cricketers' Almanack 1990

1989 in Australian cricket
1989 in Pakistani cricket
1989–90 Australian cricket season
1990 in Australian cricket
1990 in Pakistani cricket
International cricket competitions from 1988–89 to 1991
1989-90